Chrome and Hot Leather is a 1971 American action revenge film about Green Berets vs. bikers with touches of comedy. It is one of two films to feature singer Marvin Gaye in an acting role, the other being the 1969 film The Ballad of Andy Crocker.

Plot
When the fiancee of a US Special Forces Vietnam Veteran sergeant is killed by bikers, he and three fellow Green Berets ride out for revenge.

Cast
William Smith as T.J. 
Tony Young as Mitch
Michael Haynes as Casey
Peter Brown as Al
Marvin Gaye as Jim
Michael Stearns as Hank
Larry Bishop as Gabe
Kathrine Baumann as Susan (as Kathy Baumann)
Wes Bishop as Sheriff Lewis
Herb Jeffries as Ned
Bobby Pickett as Sweet Willy (as Bob Pickett)
George Carey as Lieutenant Reardon
Cheryl Ladd as Kathy 
Dan Haggerty as Bearded Biker
Erik Estrada (uncredited)
Ann Marie as Helen  
Robert Ridgely as Sergeant Mack
Lee Frost as Motorcycle Salesman

See also
 List of American films of 1971

References

External links

1971 films
Films directed by Lee Frost
Outlaw biker films
American International Pictures films
American action films
American films about revenge
American vigilante films
1970s action films
Films about United States Army Special Forces
1970s American films